Megachoriolaus is a genus of beetles in the family Cerambycidae, containing the following species:

 Megachoriolaus atripennis (Bates, 1870)
 Megachoriolaus bicolor (Gounelle, 1911)
 Megachoriolaus chemsaki Linsley, 1970
 Megachoriolaus clarkei Monne & Monne, 2008
 Megachoriolaus cruentus (Martin, 1930)
 Megachoriolaus flammatus (Linsley, 1961)
 Megachoriolaus ignitus (Schaeffer, 1908)
 Megachoriolaus imitatrix Linsley, 1970
 Megachoriolaus lineaticollis Chemsak & Linsley, 1974
 Megachoriolaus nigricollis Chemsak & Linsley, 1974
 Megachoriolaus patricia (Bates, 1885)
 Megachoriolaus spiniferus (Linsley, 1961)
 Megachoriolaus sylvainae Audureau, 2010
 Megachoriolaus texanus (Knull, 1941)
 Megachoriolaus unicolor (Bates, 1892)
 Megachoriolaus venustus (Breme, 1844)
 Megachoriolaus yucatanus Giesbert & Wappes, 1999

References

Lepturinae